The Montreal River is a river flowing to Lake Superior in northern Wisconsin and the Upper Peninsula of Michigan in the United States. For most of its length, the river's course defines a portion of the Wisconsin–Michigan border. The Ojibwe name for the river is Gaa-waasijiwaang, meaning "where there is whitewater".

The Montreal River issues from Pine Lake in the town of Oma in eastern Iron County in northern Wisconsin. It flows initially northwardly to the boundary between Iron County and Gogebic County, Michigan, then northwestwardly along the state line, past the 'twin cities' of Hurley, Wisconsin and Ironwood, Michigan. Downstream of Ironwood and Hurley the Montreal River passes over four named waterfalls. Starting below U.S. Route 2 and going downstream (north), they are Peterson, Interstate, Saxon, and Superior Falls; the last two located just upstream of the river's mouth at Lake Superior.

The West Fork Montreal River issues from Island Lake in central Iron County and flows  generally northwardly, roughly in parallel to the Montreal River, past the city of Montreal, Wisconsin. It flows into the Montreal River downstream of Hurley.  There are four named waterfalls on the West Fork Montreal River: Kimball Falls, Rock Cut Falls, Gile Falls, and Spring Camp Falls.

Both forks of the Montreal River flow through the Gogebic Range, a range of hills near Hurley and Ironwood.  The rivers are located in the Laurentian Mixed Forest Province (north woods) region of the upper midwest.

See also
List of Michigan rivers
List of Wisconsin rivers
River borders of U.S. states

References

Rivers of Michigan
Rivers of Wisconsin
Rivers of Gogebic County, Michigan
Rivers of Iron County, Wisconsin
Borders of Michigan
Borders of Wisconsin
Tributaries of Lake Superior